18 Minutes is a 1935 British drama film directed by Monty Banks and starring Gregory Ratoff, John Loder and Benita Hume. It was shot at Walton Studios near London.

Plot
A lion tamer adopts an orphaned girl and marries her, only to find that she loves another.

Cast
 Gregory Ratoff as Nikita 
 John Loder as Trelawney 
 Benita Hume as Lady Phyllis Pilcott 
 Katharine Sergava as Lida 
 Richard Bennett as Korn 
 Hugh Wakefield as Lord Pilcott 
 Paul Graetz as Pietro 
 Rosamund Barnes as Lida as a Child 
 Carl Harbord as Jacques 
 Margaret Yarde as Marie 
 Hal Gordon as Osso

Critical reception
TV Guide described 18 Minutes as an "Interesting drama, way above average for British films of the time"; and rated it three out of five stars.

References

Bibliography
 Low, Rachael. Filmmaking in 1930s Britain. George Allen & Unwin, 1985.
 Wood, Linda. British Films, 1927-1939. British Film Institute, 1986.

External links
 

1935 films
British drama films
1935 drama films
Films directed by Monty Banks
Circus films
British black-and-white films
1930s English-language films
1930s British films
Films shot at Nettlefold Studios